Varthamanam is a Malayalam Newspaper printed and published from Kozhikode, Kerala, India since 2003. Sukumar Azhikode was the chief editor of the paper.

References

External links 

 Womens Page
 Malayalam Newspapers Online
 VARTHAMANAM MALAYALAM EPAPER
 Varthamanam
 Varthamanam Epaper

Newspapers published in India
Malayalam-language newspapers